The 1923 United Kingdom general election was held on Thursday 6 December 1923. The Conservatives, led by Prime Minister Stanley Baldwin, won the most seats, but Labour, led by Ramsay MacDonald, and H. H. Asquith's reunited Liberal Party gained enough seats to produce a hung parliament. It is the most recent UK general election in which a third party (here, the Liberals) won over 100 seats. The Liberals' percentage of the vote, 29.7%, has not been exceeded by a third party at any general election since.

MacDonald formed the first ever Labour government with tacit support from the Liberals. Rather than trying to bring the Liberals back into government, Asquith's motivation for permitting Labour to enter power was that he hoped they would prove to be incompetent and quickly lose support. Being a minority, MacDonald's government only lasted ten months and another general election was held in October 1924.

Overview
In May 1923, Prime Minister Bonar Law fell ill and resigned on 22 May, after just 209 days in office. He was replaced by Chancellor of the Exchequer, Stanley Baldwin. The Labour Party had also changed leaders since the previous election, after J. R. Clynes was defeated in a leadership challenge by former leader Ramsay MacDonald.

Having won an election just the year before, Baldwin's Conservative Party had a comfortable majority in the House of Commons and could have waited another four years, but the government was concerned. Baldwin felt the need to receive a mandate from the people, which, if successful, would strengthen his grip on the Conservative Party leadership and allow him to introduce tariff reform and imperial preference as protectionist trade policies over the objections of the free trade elements of his party.

Oxford historian and Conservative MP John Marriott depicts the gloomy national mood:

Parliament was dissolved on 16 November and the result backfired on Baldwin, who lost a host of seats to Labour and the Liberals, resulting in a hung parliament. A reformation of the Conservative-Liberal coalition which had governed the country until the previous year was not practical, as Baldwin had alienated both of the two most prominent Liberals, Asquith and David Lloyd George.

Faced with the choice of supporting either a minority Conservative or Labour government on an issue-by-issue basis, Asquith ultimately chose the latter, partly because Lloyd George's faction was vehemently opposed to working with Baldwin (though Asquith's allies were themselves unenthusiastic about such a prospect), and partly because he believed that Labour's electoral success thus far was mostly the result of the previous split in the Liberal Party, and that a Labour government would expose the party's policies as unworkable, allowing for the Liberals to overtake them at the next election. The Liberals therefore combined with Labour to vote down the King's Speech prepared by Baldwin, causing his government to fall. For the first time in history, Labour formed a government.

Results

|}

Votes summary

Seats summary

Constituency results

Transfers of seats 
 All comparisons are with the 1922 election.
In some cases the change is due to the MP defecting to the gaining party. Such circumstances are marked with a *.
In other circumstances the change is due to the seat having been won by the gaining party in a by-election in the intervening years, and then retained in 1923. Such circumstances are marked with a †.

See also
List of MPs elected in the 1923 United Kingdom general election
2019 United Kingdom general election, the next UK general election after 1923 to be held in December.
1923 United Kingdom general election in Northern Ireland

Notes

References

Sources

Further reading

External links
United Kingdom election results—summary results 1885–1979

Manifestos
1923 Conservative manifesto
1923 Labour manifesto
1923 Liberal manifesto

 
1923
General election
December 1923 events in Europe
Ramsay MacDonald
Stanley Baldwin
H. H. Asquith